Stan Barker (24 May 1926 – 2 July 1997) was an English jazz pianist born in Clitheroe, Lancashire. He has taught in a variety of educational institutions, including the Royal Northern College of Music, the Belfast School of Music, Merseyside Arts, South Wales Art Association and the Southport Arts Centre. In addition to teaching jazz, Barker has done recordings and gigs with such artists as Digby Fairweather, Al Grey, Buddy Tate, Al Wood,  and Billy Butterfield. Barker did not become a professional musician until the age of 50 when he formed the Stan Barker Trio. Barker died at the age of 71.

Discography
Stan Barker Trio-Volume 1 (Very Rare) (Nelson Records)
Stan Barker and Digby Fairweather: Let's Duet (Essex Records)

1926 births
1997 deaths
English jazz pianists
People from Clitheroe
20th-century British pianists
20th-century English musicians